The 1914 Swansea District by-election was held on 13 August 1914.  The by-election was held due to the incumbent Liberal MP, Sir David Brynmor Jones, becoming Recorder of Cardiff.  It was retained by Jones who was unopposed due to a War-time electoral pact.

References

1910s in Glamorgan
1914 elections in the United Kingdom
1914 in Wales
1910s elections in Wales
20th century in Swansea
Elections in Swansea
By-elections to the Parliament of the United Kingdom in Welsh constituencies
Unopposed by-elections to the Parliament of the United Kingdom (need citation)
Politics of Glamorgan